was a village located in Mugi District, Gifu Prefecture, Japan.

As of 2005, the village had an estimated population of 2,306 and a density of 46.76 persons per km2. The total area was 49.32 km2.

On 7 February 2005, Kaminoho, along with the towns of Mugegawa and Mugi, and the villages of Horado and Itadori (all from Mugi District), was merged into the expanded city of Seki.

Notes

External links
 Seki official website 

Dissolved municipalities of Gifu Prefecture
Populated places disestablished in 2005
Seki, Gifu
2005 disestablishments in Japan